The 2015 Major League Lacrosse season was the 16th season of FIL-sanctioned lacrosse in the United States and Canada, the 16th with a national first-division league, and the 15th season of Major League Lacrosse. The season featured  8 total clubs (all in the United States). The regular season was held from April 12 through July 25, with the semifinals on August 1 and the championship game on August 8 in Kennesaw, Georgia. The defending Steinfeld Cup champions are the Denver Outlaws, while the Rochester Rattlers finished as the runner-up.

Milestones & events
January 23, 2015- The Collegiate Draft took place in Baltimore, Maryland. The draft was live to watch on ESPN 3.
July 4, 2015- Once again, the Denver Outlaws set an attendance record on their annual 4 July game with 31,644. However, those fans watched the Outlaws get demolished by Boston, 22-9.

Teams

Stadiums and locations

Standings

All Star Game 

The All Star Game, was held on June 13, 2015 at BBVA Compass Stadium in Houston, Texas. It was the first time an MLL event has been hosted in the Houston area.

Playoffs
The Semi Final games were held at Delaware, Ohio and  Hempstead, New York. The championship game was played at Fifth Third Bank Stadium in Kennesaw, Georgia starting at 7 pm EDT.

References 

http://www.majorleaguelacrosse.com/college-draft/
http://mll.stats.pointstreak.com/standings.html?leagueid=323&seasonid=13736

External links
 Official Site

15
Major League Lacrosse
Lacrosse